The 1942 Copa Ibarguren was the 19th edition of a national cup of Argentina. From this edition onwards, the cup was contested by the winners of Primera División and the Copa Presidente de la Nación (a competition formed by teams from regional leagues).

The final was contested by River Plate (1942 Primera División champion), and Liga Cordobesa de Fútbol ("Córdoba League"), champion of the 1942 Copa Presidente.

Due to the similarity of both teams' shirts, the referee forced River Plate (as the home team) to change their kit. As River Plate had not brought alternate shirts, host club San Lorenzo de Almagro lent them their blue and red shirts to play the match. River Plate thrashed Liga Cordobesa 7–0 at Estadio Gasómetro, winning their 3rd Copa Ibarguren title.

Qualified teams

Match details

References 

i
1942 in Argentine football
1942 in South American football